Jacob Schaefer Sr. (February 2, 1855 – March 8, 1910), nicknamed "the Wizard", was a professional carom billiards player, especially of the straight rail and balkline games, and was posthumously inducted into the Billiard Congress of America Hall of Fame in 1968.

Schaefer was born in 1855 in Milwaukee, Wisconsin. He was the first US-born son of German emigrants. He was the father of fellow billiards pro Jacob Schaefer Jr. (1894-1975).

He became one of the world's top balkline players, to such an extent that some of the more challenging versions of balkline were invented to attempt to level the playing field against him. He won matches and titles around the world, including the March 11, 1908 World 18.1 Balkline Championship versus Willie Hoppe, although extremely ill, he won the match by 500 points to 423. He died of tuberculosis in 1910 in Denver, Colorado.

Titles
 World Straight rail Championship (1879-1981)
 World 18.2 Balkline Championship (1885-1884)
 World 14.2 Balkline Championship (1885-1890, 1893)
 World 18.1 Balkline Championship (1901, 1908)

References

External links  
 Jacob Schaefer Sr

American carom billiards players
1855 births
1910 deaths
American people of German descent
World champions in carom billiards